Pseudhammus affinis is a species of beetle in the family Cerambycidae. It was described by Dillon and Dillon in 1959.

References

affinis
Beetles described in 1959